Nils Nilsen Hilsen (20 May 1794 – 25 July 1872) was a Norwegian teacher and politician.

He hailed from Snarum in Modum, but worked as a sexton and teacher in Lier. Among others he served as mayor and director of the loval savings bank. He was a brother of fellow politician Hans Nilsen Gubberud.

He was elected to the Parliament of Norway in 1847. He then had a one-term hiatus before being steadily re-elected in 1853, 1856, 1859 and 1862. He represented the constituency of Buskeruds Amt.

References

1794 births
1872 deaths
People from Modum
People from Lier, Norway
Norwegian schoolteachers
Members of the Storting
Mayors of places in Buskerud